The D.I.C.E. Award for Outstanding Achievement for an Independent Game is an award presented annually by the Academy of Interactive Arts & Sciences during the academy's annual D.I.C.E. Awards. This is "awarded to a game that embodies the independent spirit of game creation, representing a higher degree of risk tolerance and advances our media with innovative gameplay and experiences." It was preceded by the D.I.C.E. Sprite Award which was "awarded to a game having disproportionate resources for development and exposure (as compared to AAA titles)."

The most recent winner was Tunic, developed by Isometricorps Games and published by Finji.

Winners and nominees

2010s

2020s

Multiple nominations and wins

Developers and publishers 
Supergiant Games is the only developer so far that has multiple nominations, and is also both the only developer and publisher with multiple wins.The only other publishers with multiple nominations are Annapurna Interactive, Devolver Digital, and Finji.

Notes

References 

D.I.C.E. Awards
 Awards established in 2015